Lomovka is a rural locality (a khutor) in Baninsky Selsoviet Rural Settlement, Fatezhsky District, Kursk Oblast, Russia. The population as of 2010 is 6.

Geography 
The khutor is located in the Gnilovodchik River basin (a link tributary of the Usozha in the basin of the Svapa), 109 km from the Russia–Ukraine border, 51 km north-west of Kursk, 7 km north-east of the district center – the town Fatezh, 5 km from the selsoviet center – Chermoshnoy.

Climate
Lomovka has a warm-summer humid continental climate (Dfb in the Köppen climate classification).

Transport 
Lomovka is located 4.5 km from the federal route  Crimea Highway as part of the European route E105, 8 km from the road of regional importance  (Fatezh – Dmitriyev), 1 km from the road of intermunicipal significance  (M2 "Crimea Highway" – 1st Banino), 25.5 km from the nearest railway station Vozy (railway line Oryol – Kursk).

The rural locality is situated 52 km from Kursk Vostochny Airport, 173 km from Belgorod International Airport and 231 km from Voronezh Peter the Great Airport.

References

Notes

Sources

Rural localities in Fatezhsky District